USS LST-80 was a  in the Royal Navy during World War II.

Construction and career 
LST-80 was laid down on 16 March 1943 at Jeffersonville Boat and Machine Co., Jeffersonville, Indiana. Launched on 18 May 1943 and commissioned on 7 July 1943. The ship was later transferred to the Royal Navy and commissioned on 19 July 1943. The ship was assigned 9th LST Flotilla.

She took part in the Invasion of Normandy, June 1944.

While underway in Convoy ATM97, she was sunk by two naval mines off Ostend, Belgium, 20 March 1945. 

LST-80 was struck from the Navy Register on 11 July 1945.

Citations

Sources 

 
 
 
 

 

World War II amphibious warfare vessels of the United Kingdom
Ships built in Jeffersonville, Indiana
1943 ships
LST-1-class tank landing ships of the Royal Navy
Ships sunk by mines